Skåtøy''' is the largest island in Kragerø municipality in Telemark county, Norway.

Skåtøy was formerly a  municipality. Skåtøy was separated from Sannidal January 1, 1882. It was merged with Kragerø January 1, 1960.

Skåtøy is the biggest island in the skerries outside the town of Kragerø, Norway. The island is 8.8 km2 and is partially wooded. It has only a small year round population. Skåtøy and Kragerø are popular holiday destinations among Norwegians. Every year since 2000, Skåtøy residents have held the Skåtøy poetry festival Skåtøy Vise in mid-July.  Kragerø Fjordbåtselskap runs a ferry  in the Kragerø archipelago which connects with Skåtøy and Stabbestad.

The name
Until 1918 the name was written "Skaatø", in the period 1918-1920 "Skaatøy", from 1921 on "Skåtøy". The municipality was named after the island Skåtøy. The first element is skot n 'overhang', the last element is øy'' f 'island'.

See also
 Skåtøy Church - nicknamed the "cathedral of the skerries"

External links  
 Kragerø Municipality website
 Skåtøy poetry festival
 Visit Kragerø about Skåtøy
 Skåtøy church

Former municipalities of Norway
Kragerø
Islands of Vestfold og Telemark